West Jampang or Jampang Kulon is a town in West Java, the administrative center of a district by the same name in Sukabumi regency.

References

Populated places in West Java
Sukabumi Regency